Johannes Seidlitz (born 13 June 1990) is a German racing driver from Wassertrüdingen. He currently competes in the ADAC GT Masters championship.

Racing career

Single-seaters
After competing in karting between 2001 and 2006, Johannes moved onto Formula BMW, competing in Formula BMW ADAC in 2007.

He moved into the British Formula Renault BARC series for 2008. He collected four wins and two second places on his way to second in the final championship standings, finishing behind Ollie Hancock for Mark Burdett Motorsport.

DTM (2009-)
Despite being relatively unknown, even in his native Germany, he was signed by Colin Kolles to drive a two-year-old Audi A4 for his DTM team for 2009. He finished thirteenth on his debut at Hockenheimring, but suffered a crash in free practice ahead of the second round at EuroSpeedway Lausitz, damaging his car beyond repair for the race, or the following race at the Norisring.

ADAC GT Masters (2010-)
He is currently racing with Team Rosberg in an Audi R8 LMS. Two of his team mates are Kenneth Heyer and Michael Ammermüller.

Racing record

Complete DTM results
(key) (Races in bold indicate pole position) (Races in italics indicate fastest lap)

References

External links
Official Website

1990 births
Living people
People from Ansbach (district)
Sportspeople from Middle Franconia
Deutsche Tourenwagen Masters drivers
German racing drivers
British Formula Renault 2.0 drivers
Formula Renault BARC drivers
Formula BMW ADAC drivers
Racing drivers from Bavaria
ADAC GT Masters drivers
Audi Sport drivers
Kolles Racing drivers
Mark Burdett Motorsport drivers
Team Rosberg drivers